Circle Icefall is an almost impenetrable icefall near Tentacle Ridge,  high and  long, extending in an arc for almost the whole width across the Darwin Glacier. It was named by the Darwin Glacier Party of the Commonwealth Trans-Antarctic Expedition (1956–58) for its similarity to the circle of an opera house.

Further reading 
 Jane G. Ferrigno, Kevin M. Foley, Charles Swithinbank, and Richard S. Williams, Jr, Coastal-Change and Glaciological Map of the Ross Island Area, Antarctica: 1962–2005, USGS

References 

Icefalls of Oates Land